WENK is an AM radio station based in northwest Tennessee. In its first incarnation, WENK-AM 1240 went on the air with 250 watts day and night from the upstairs of a furniture store on October 26, 1946. WTPR-AM 710 went on the air with 250 watts daytime from the second floor of a building on the square in downtown Paris in 1947. Both were owned by the Dixie Network of Jackson, Tennessee. and had at the time a variety format.

WENK featured the talents of people like Hank Huggins and Lou Wrather during the early days.  WTPR was home to future Nashville star Ralph Emery and future WPSD-TV newsman Dan Steele.

WENK caught the Rock and Roll bug in 1956 and for the most part remained a popular music or Top 40 station until WWKF took that format in 1982.  John Dixon Williams, a future WPSD-TV newsman and general manager was an early star.  WTPR continued to play a variety of music over the years.

WENK increased its power to 1000 Watts in the early 1960s and WTPR was able to increase its power to 1000 watts daytime as well.  During this period personalities like J. R. Moore and Ed Taylor were heard on WENK, along with Jolly George and John True.  WTPR featured Bill McCutcheon.  The late Gary Powley who worked at WTPR in the 1990s and until his death in 2005 actually got his start at WENK in 1968.

Present day President and General Manager Terry Hailey followed Gary Powley at WENK in 1968 and has been with the station ever since.  Cindy Snyder was one of the driving forces behind WTPR in the 1980s and 1990s.   Joe Van Dyke was long time general manager at WTPR for the Dixie Network.

Station information
WENK purchased WTPR in 1989. WTPR then adopted WENK's Oldies format which continues today.  WTWL, Dover/McKinnon, was added in 1994 with call letters changed to WTPR-FM.  The station was at 101.5, but changed to 101.7 in June 2005.  WENK, WTPR and WTPR-FM are now a three way simulcast of ‘The Greatest Hits of All Time’ and are on AM1240, AM710 and FM101.7.  The stations can be heard in southeast Missouri, northeast Arkansas...and all across northwest Tennessee and southwest Kentucky from Reelfoot Lake to Kentucky Lake to Clarksville.  Their sister stations WWGY and WRQR-FM (KF99/KQ105) play Contemporary Hit music or Top 40, the format they took from WENK in 1982.

Effective December 28, 2016, WENK of Union City sold WENK, WTPR, WTPR-FM, WAKQ, and WWKF to Forever Media for $500,000.

Sister stations
WWGY 99.3 - Fulton, Kentucky/Union City, Tennessee
WRQR-FM 105.5 - Paris, Tennessee

External links
WENK official website
Forever Communications Website

ENK
News and talk radio stations in the United States
ENK